Dipsas pratti, known commonly as Pratt's snail-eater, is a species of arboreal snake in the subfamily Dipsadinae of the family Colubridae. The species is endemic to northern South America.

Etymology
The specific name, pratti, is in honor of British naturalist Antwerp Edgar Pratt.

Geographic range
D. pratti is found in Colombia and Venezuela.

Biology
Very few examples of D. pratti have been studied, and the first photograph of a live example of this species was not published until 2012.

References

Further reading
Boulenger, G.A. (1897). "Description of a new Snake from the Andes of Colombia". Ann. Mag. Nat. Hist., Sixth Series 20: 523. (Leptognathus pratti, new species).
Peters, James A. (1960). "The snakes of the subfamily Dipsadinae". Misc. Publ. Mus. Zool., Univ. Michigan (114): 1-224 + Plates I-VIII. (Dipsas pratti, new combination, pp. 112–115).

pratti
Snakes of South America
Reptiles of Colombia
Reptiles of Venezuela
Reptiles described in 1897